An election took place on November 4, 2008 to elect the delegate to the United States House of Representatives from American Samoa's At-large congressional district. The non-voting delegate is elected for two-year terms.  The election coincided with the 2008 U.S. presidential election. Incumbent Eni Faleomavaega was re-elected.

Candidates 
All elections in American Samoa are officially non-partisan, but incumbent Faleomavaega identifies with the Democratic Party and challenger Amata with the Republican Party.

Results

See also 
American Samoan general election, 2008

References  

United States House of Representatives
American Samoa
Non-partisan elections
2008